detriment may refer to:

 detriment (astrology)
 detriment (law), an element the benefit-detriment theory of consideration in design without converting